Underground Service Alert (USA) is a non-profit mutual benefit organization that links the excavation community and the owners of underground lines. Underground Service Alert has two separate call centers for California: Underground Service Alert of Northern California (USA North) and Underground Service Alert of Southern California (USA South, aka DigAlert).  Although they are not affiliated and are run by separate boards of directors, they share the common goal of safe digging. USA North handles Northern and Central California as well as Nevada. DigAlert handles nine Southern California counties. Calls to either center are free for all homeowners, excavators and professional contractors who are digging, blasting, trenching, drilling, grading, excavating, or otherwise moving any earth.

USA began operation in 1976 and incorporated as a mutual-benefit nonprofit corporation in 1986. USA receives planned excavation reports from public and private excavators and transmits those reports to participating members of USA. USA members include private companies and public agencies that have underground lines or facilities. The USA members will either mark or stake their facility, provide information or give clearance to dig.

See also
Utility location
8-1-1

References

Further reading

External links
Underground Service Alert of Northern California
Underground Service Alert of Southern California
All one-call agencies by state

Public utilities of the United States
Subterranea of the United States
Non-profit organizations based in California